The Magic Sword (Čudotvorni mač) is a 1950 Yugoslav fantasy/adventure film based on Serbian folk tales, primarily The Nine Peahens and the Golden Apples but also including elements (such as the villain) from Baš Čelik.

Cast
Rade Marković as Nebojša
Vera Ilić-Đukić as Vida
Milivoje Živanović as Baš Čelik
Marko Marinković as Grandpa Ivan
Bata Paskaljević as Gricko
Milan Ajvaz as Vida's father
Ljubiša Jovanović as The old man
Pavle Vujisić as The knight
Vilma Žedrinski as The empress
Zora Zlatković as The witch

See also 
Cinema of Serbia
List of films based on Slavic mythology

References

External links

1950 films
1950s fantasy adventure films
Yugoslav fantasy adventure films
Films based on fairy tales
Serbian-language films
Serbian fantasy films
Films based on Slavic mythology
Films directed by Vojislav Nanovic
Films set in Serbia
Films set in Yugoslavia
Yugoslav black-and-white films